Matsuri refers to Japanese festivals.

Matsuri may also refer to:

People
Matsuri Akino, a Japanese manga artist
, Japanese diver
Matsuri Hino, a Japanese manga artist
Natsuiro Matsuri, a virtual YouTuber affiliated with Hololive Production

Fictional characters
, a fictional character from the anime/manga series Lucky Star
Matsuri Sakuragi, a fictional character from the Japanese manga series Strawberry Marshmallow
Matsuri Shihou, a fictional character from Sola (manga)
Matsuri Tatsumi, a fictional character from Super Sentai series, Kyuukyuu Sentai GoGoFive.
, a fictional character from The Idolmaster Million Live!

Other
Matsuri, Estonia, a village in Estonia
 "Matsuri", a song by Kitarō from the album Kojiki
 "Matsuri", a song by Fujii Kaze from the album Love All Serve All
 Anime Matsuri, an annual anime convention in Houston, TX
 Higurashi Matsuri, the fourth Higurashi series
 Matsuricon, an annual anime convention in Columbus, OH

Japanese feminine given names